In Greek mythology, Enarete (Ancient Greek:  "virtuous" literally "in virtue", from en "in" and arete "virtue") or  Aenarete ( Ainarete), was a queen of Aeolia (i.e. Thessaly) and ancestor of the Aeolians.

Biography 
Enarete was the daughter of Deimachus and wife of King Aeolus of Thessaly, son of the Greek progenitor Hellen. By the latter, she became the mother of his children including Cretheus, Sisyphus, Athamas, Salmoneus, Deion, Magnes, Perieres, Canace, Alcyone, Peisidice, Calyce and Perimede.

Enarete may be similar to Eurydice who bore Salmoneus, Sisyphus and Cretheus to Aeolus.

Notes

References
Diodorus Siculus, The Library of History translated by Charles Henry Oldfather. Twelve volumes. Loeb Classical Library. Cambridge, Massachusetts: Harvard University Press; London: William Heinemann, Ltd. 1989. Vol. 3. Books 4.59–8. Online version at Bill Thayer's Web Site
Diodorus Siculus, Bibliotheca Historica. Vol 1-2. Immanel Bekker. Ludwig Dindorf. Friedrich Vogel. in aedibus B. G. Teubneri. Leipzig. 1888-1890. Greek text available at the Perseus Digital Library.
Pausanias, Description of Greece with an English Translation by W.H.S. Jones, Litt.D., and H.A. Ormerod, M.A., in 4 Volumes. Cambridge, MA, Harvard University Press; London, William Heinemann Ltd. 1918. . Online version at the Perseus Digital Library
Pausanias, Graeciae Descriptio. 3 vols. Leipzig, Teubner. 1903.  Greek text available at the Perseus Digital Library.
Pseudo-Apollodorus, The Library with an English Translation by Sir James George Frazer, F.B.A., F.R.S. in 2 Volumes, Cambridge, MA, Harvard University Press; London, William Heinemann Ltd. 1921. . Online version at the Perseus Digital Library. Greek text available from the same website.
.
Queens in Greek mythology

Thessalian characters in Greek mythology
Thessalian mythology